Miao Peinan (1895–1970) was a Chinese Kuomintang general from Wuhua, Guangdong.

Military career
Miao's military career began in 1926 when he was appointed commanding officer of the 35th Regiment, 12th Division, 4th Army. Within a year he in command of the division and within a few months he was made officer in-charge of the 4th Army. In 1931, he became Chief of Staff of the 8th Route Army. The same year he was also appointed Chief of Staff of the 1st Army Group. Then in 1936 he was given the post of the Commanding Officer Officer 5th Army. Miao moved higher up the military command chain when in 1940 he became the Deputy Commanding Officer Guangdong-Fujian-Jiangxi Border Area as well as the Commander-in-Chief, 9th Army Group. In 1945 he was made Acting Director of Dongjiang Field Headquarters, 7th War Area. He was the Republic of China government representative to accept the Japanese surrender in Guangdong in 1945. His continued to move up the army hierarchy with his appointment as the Deputy Director of Guangdong Pacification Headquarters in 1947.

Retirement
In 1949, after the Nationalists lost the Chinese Civil War, he did not move to Taiwan but chose to retire in Hong Kong. He died of illness in 1970.

References

National Revolutionary Army generals from Guangdong
Hong Kong people of Hakka descent
People from Wuhua
Hakka generals
1895 births
1970 deaths